Chantry Division, Suffolk is an electoral division of Suffolk which returns two county councillors to Suffolk County Council. It is located in the South West Area of Ipswich and consists of Gipping Ward, Sprites Ward and Stoke Park Ward of Ipswich Borough Council.

References

Electoral Divisions of Suffolk